Onni Valakari (born 18 August 1999) is a Finnish professional footballer who plays as an attacking midfielder for Cypriot First Division club Pafos and the Finnish national team.

Career
On 5 August 2018 Valakari signed with the Norwegian club Tromsø, In January 2020 he moved to Pafos. On 25 November 2022, Valakari extended his contract with Pafos until June 2026.

International career
He played for Finland at under-19 and under-21 levels.

Valakari made his senior international debut for Finland on 11 November 2020, scoring on his debut in a 2-0 victory over France. The other goalscorer was fellow debutant Marcus Forss.

Valakari was called up for the UEFA Euro 2020 pre-tournament friendly match against Sweden on 29 May 2021. He was eligible for Scotland due to being born in the country.

Personal life
His father Simo and brother Paavo have also played football professionally. Onni was born in Scotland when his father had a stint as a player at Motherwell. He was eligible for Scotland due to being born in the country.

Career statistics

Club

International

As of match played on 7 June 2022. Scores and results list Finland's goal tally first.

References

1999 births
Living people
Finnish footballers
Finland youth international footballers
Finland under-21 international footballers
Finland international footballers
SJK Akatemia players
Turun Palloseura footballers
Salon Palloilijat players
Veikkausliiga players
Ykkönen players
Kakkonen players
Eliteserien players
Cypriot First Division players
Association football midfielders
Pafos FC players
Tromsø IL players
UEFA Euro 2020 players
Finnish expatriate footballers
Finnish expatriate sportspeople in Norway
Expatriate footballers in Norway
Finnish expatriate sportspeople in Cyprus
Expatriate footballers in Cyprus